A trapiche is a type of mill used to extract juice.

Trapiche may also refer to:

 Trapiche (Canary Islands), a neighbourhood in the municipality of Arucas, Las Palmas on the island of Gran Canaria
 Trapiche, San Luis, a city in San Luis Province of Argentina
 Trapiche (winery), a winery in Mendoza, Argentina
 Trapiche, a neighborhood in Maceió, state of Alagoas, Brazil
 Trapiche, a star-shaped pattern of inclusions sometimes found in gemstones, including trapiche emerald, ruby, sapphire and tourmaline